The 1992 Strachan Open was a professional ranking snooker tournament, that was held from 2–7 March 1992 at the Thorbury Leisure Centre, Bristol, England. This tournament was a one-off ranking event sponsored by the well known billiard table cloth company. It carried a slightly lower points tariff and a considerably lower prize fund than the main ranking events and as such was boycotted by several of the top players.
 
James Wattana won the tournament by defeating John Parrott nine frames to five in the final. Peter Ebdon made a maximum break in qualifying against Wayne Martin.


Main draw

References

1992 in snooker
1992 in British sport
Strachan Open
Strachan Open, 1992